Santiago Hernández (born 1 October 1979) is a Mexican sailor. He competed in the men's 470 event at the 2000 Summer Olympics.

References

External links
 

1979 births
Living people
Mexican male sailors (sport)
Olympic sailors of Mexico
Sailors at the 2000 Summer Olympics – 470
Place of birth missing (living people)